Changatham is a 1983 Indian Malayalam-language film, directed by Bhadran, starring Mammootty, Mohanlal, Madhavi, and Captain Raju.

Plot
Annie (Madhavi) works as a typist in Daniel's (Mohanlal) office and he has an eye on her. She is often followed by Tony (Mammootty), a wealthy businessman and he confesses his love for her. Finally Tony marries Annie, which irks Daniel. Soon life starts disturbing Annie as she finds out that Tony was actually cheating her as he is a conman. Tony explains her why he became a conman and of his past struggling life. In between Daniel gets killed by Tony as he tries to rape Annie. A Police officer Prem (Captain Raju) is appointed to investigate this case. Meanwhile, Annie understands Tony and his good intentions and finally starts supporting her husband in all his activities as a partner. The climax reveals whether they get caught for all the wrong deeds.

Cast
Mammootty as Dileep / Tony
Mohanlal as S. T. Daniel
Madhavi as Annie
Jagathi Sreekumar as Sulfikker
Paravoor Bharathan as Swamy
Shankaradi
Captain Raju as Police inspector 
Sathyakala as Usha

Soundtrack
The music was composed by G. Devarajan and Raveendran and the lyrics were written by Puthiyankam Murali and Vayalar Ramavarma.

References

External links
 

1983 films
1980s Malayalam-language films
Films directed by Bhadran